The following is the discography of Yo-Yo, an American hip hop musician.

Discography

Studio albums

Unreleased albums
Ebony (1998)

EPs

Singles

As lead artist

Featured singles

Promotional singles

Miscellaneous appearances
1990 "It's a Man's World" (with Ice Cube) (AmeriKKKa's Most Wanted)
1991 "Debbie B. ft. Yo Yo - Pack Your Bags
1991 "Mama Don't Take No Mess" (Boyz in the Hood SDTK)
1992 "Get the Fist" (with B-Real, Ice Cube, J-Dee, Kam, King Tee, MC Eiht, Threat) (VA - Get the Fist Movement)
1993 "Romantic Call" (with Patra) (Queen of the Pack)
1994 "I Wanna Be Down (Remix)" (with Brandy, MC Lyte & Queen Latifah) (Baby CD SINGLE)
1994 "Sweet on You" (with Teena Marie) (Passion Play)
1995 "Freedom (Theme From Panther)" (with VA) (Panther SDTK)
1995 "Stomp" (with Coolio, Luniz, Melle Mel, Shaquille O'Neal) (Q's Jook Joint)
1995 "Crazay" (VA - Pump Ya Fist)
1996 "I Can't Take No More" (Girls Town SDTK)
1997 "Keep on Pushin'" (ft MC Lyte, Bahamadia, Nonchalant) (Dangerous Ground SDTK)
1997 "True Dat" (with Levert & Queen Pen) (The Whole Scenario)
1999 "Set Trippin'" (with Dresta, I Smooth 7) (VA - Gumbo Roots)
2005 "Mercedes Boy" (B-Side to Mobb Deep's "Get Twisted" 12")
2005 "Only 4 the Righteous" (with 2Pac) (The Rose, Vol. 2)
2005 "Boogie Oogie Oogie" (with Brooke Valentine & Lynden,Moet) (Roll Bounce SDTK)
2009 "Watcha Wan Do" (with DJ Quik, Kurupt & Problem) (BlaQKout)
2009 "Morning Comes" (with Ray J) (Non-Album Track)
2010 "Só Rezo 0.2" (with Nx Zero & Emicida) (Projeto Paralelo)

References

Notes

Citations

Hip hop discographies
Discographies of American artists